Verkh-Tula is a settlement (a posyolok) and the administrative center of Verkh-Tulinsky Selsoviet in Novosibirsky District of Novosibirsk Oblast, Russia. It was founded in 1654. Population: 6020 (2010 Census).

History
The settlement was founded in 1654.

In 1893, Verkh-Tula consisted of 120 yards, 287 men and 296 women lived in the village, there was 1 drinking establishment.

In 1911, there were 279 yards, with 716 men and 710 women, the settlement had a church, a parish school, 6 trade shops, a beer shop, a wine shop, a grain warehouse and a butter factory.

Transport
Ordynskoye Highway passes through the settlement, connecting it with Leninsky District of Novosibirsk. Another road runs from Verkh-Tula to Leninskoye. In 2017, this road was reconstructed.

References

Rural localities in Novosibirsk Oblast
Novosibirsky District
Populated places established in 1654